North East Historic District is a national historic district located at North East, Erie County, Pennsylvania.  It includes 114 contributing buildings in the central business district and surrounding residential areas of North East.  The district includes commercial, residential, institutional, and religious buildings. The buildings were built from the mid-19th to early-20th century and are in a variety of popular architectural styles including Greek Revival, Queen Anne, and Italianate.  Located at the center of the district is Gibson Park.  Notable non-residential buildings include commercial buildings along East and West Main Street and South Lake Street, the Concord Hotel, the Crescent Hose Company, Baptist Church, Presbyterian Church, and Methodist Church, two main buildings of St. Mary's Seminary, McCord Memorial Library (1916), and Heard Memorial School.

It was added to the National Register of Historic Places in 1990.

References

Historic districts on the National Register of Historic Places in Pennsylvania
Greek Revival architecture in Pennsylvania
Italianate architecture in Pennsylvania
Queen Anne architecture in Pennsylvania
Buildings and structures in Erie, Pennsylvania
National Register of Historic Places in Erie County, Pennsylvania